Mojtaba Abedini Shourmasti (born 11 August 1984) is an Iranian 3-time Olympian sabre fencer. In 2012, he became the first Iranian fencer to compete in the Olympics.  He won a bronze medal at the 2019 World Fencing Championships, becoming the first-ever Iranian fencer to win a medal at the World Fencing Championships.

Early life
Abedini was born in Tehran, Iran. He has a master's degree in Sport Administration/Management from the University of Tehran ('14), and speaks English and Persian. His wife is Narges Faal, and he has two daughters.

Fencing career
Abedini won a bronze medal at the 2019 World Fencing Championships in Budapest, Hungary, losing only to Hungarian former world champion András Szatmári, becoming the first-ever Iranian fencer to win a medal at the World Fencing Championships.

He qualified to compete in the men's sabre event of the 2012 Summer Olympics through a zone tournament held in Wakayama City, Japan, becoming the first Iranian fencer to compete at the Olympics. Abedini was defeated in the first round by Romania's Florin Zalomir, and came in 37th in individual sabre.

He also competed in men's individual sabre event at the 2016 Summer Olympics, coming in fourth.   He reached the semifinals by a series of fine performances against the likes of Andriy Yahodka, Gu Bon-gil, and Vincent Anstett but missed the chance to go on the podium when he was defeated by American Daryl Homer in the semifinals and Korean Kim Jung-hwan in the bronze medal match.

Abedini competed at the 2020 Summer Olympics, coming in 11th in individual sabre and 6th in team sabre. He was captain of the Iranian sabre team, which appeared in the Olympics for the first time ever.

Starting in 2021 he also served as a coach of the Iranian national youth fencing team.

After the September 2022 death of 22-year-old Mahsa Amini in Iran under suspicious circumstances, following her arrest by the Guidance Patrol, the Islamic morality police of Iran's Law Enforcement Command, for not wearing a hijab in accordance with government standards, Abedini resigned fencing under the Iranian team, writing: "Every time I played for the national team, it was with all my heart, because it was and is the first and last reason for the victory of the people of the land. The people of my land are being disrespected and beaten. I consider it my duty to express my sympathy and companionship with them. I must say goodbye to the Iranian national team forever out of respect for women and my country."

See also
List of Asian Games medalists in fencing

References

External links
 
Instagram page

1984 births
Living people
Asian Games silver medalists for Iran
Asian Games medalists in fencing
People from Babol
Fencers at the 2012 Summer Olympics
Fencers at the 2016 Summer Olympics
Fencers at the 2020 Summer Olympics
Fencers at the 2006 Asian Games
Fencers at the 2010 Asian Games
Fencers at the 2014 Asian Games
Fencers at the 2018 Asian Games
Iranian male sabre fencers
Medalists at the 2014 Asian Games
Medalists at the 2018 Asian Games
Olympic fencers of Iran
Sportspeople from Mazandaran province
Sportspeople from Tehran
University of Tehran alumni
21st-century Iranian people
20th-century Iranian people
Islamic Solidarity Games competitors for Iran